Eucalyptus elegans is a species of tree that is endemic to eastern Australia. It has rough bark throughout, linear to narrow lance-shaped or curved adult leaves, flower buds arranged in groups of between three and seven, white flowers and cup-shaped fruit.

Description
It has rough bark on the trunk and branches. Flowering occurs from June to December and the flowers are white.

Taxonomy and naming
Eucalyptus elegans was first described in 2005 by Anthony Bean from a specimen he collected in Bendidee National Park in 1999 and the description was published in the journal Austrobaileya. The specific epithet (elegans) is a Latin word meaning "tasteful", "choice" "fine" or "select".

Distribution and habitat
This eucalypt grows in flat or undulating country, often with Callitris glaucophylla and Casuarina luehmannii. It occurs in between Eidsvold and Inglewood in Queensland and between Narrabri and Gilgandra in New South Wales.

References

elata
Myrtales of Australia
Trees of Australia
Flora of Queensland
Flora of New South Wales
Plants described in 2005